Qarah Tappeh (also Romanized as Qareh Tappeh; also known as Kara-Tappekh and Qaratepe) is a village in Mojezat Rural District, in the Central District of Zanjan County, Zanjan Province, Iran. At the 2006 census, its population was 359, in 94 families.

References 

Populated places in Zanjan County